The boatswain's mate is a position in the United States Coast Guard. A boatswain's mate is a versatile role, with those holding the role expected to be capable of nearly any job in a Coast Guard vessel. The tasks include deck maintenance, navigation duties, and navigation. They can also take the helm of a ship when needed.

Types of Duty
BMs can be found in nearly every duty station available throughout the United States and various locations overseas. They serve on every Coast Guard Cutter, from harbor tugs to sea-going icebreakers. They work in navigation, small boat operations, deck operations, crane and pulley systems, search and rescue, deck maintenance, and small arms. Additionally, in many assignments BMs act as boarding team members (BTM) or boarding officers (BO). BMs are Officers in Charge of patrol boats, tugs, small craft, and small shore units including search and rescue stations and aids to navigation teams. BMs use their leadership and expertise to perform the missions of the Coast Guard, at sea and on shore.

Training Available
Training for boatswain's mate is accomplished through 14 weeks of training at Training Center Yorktown in Yorktown, VA. Once this training is completed, BMs may go on to other advanced training such as Coxswain, Tactical Coxswain, Pursuit Coxswain, Heavy Weather Coxswain, or Surfman.

See also
Boatswain
Boatswain's mate (US Navy)
Coxswain #United States Coast Guard

References

External links
Boatswain's Mate at the US Coast Guard web site

United States Coast Guard job titles